Toongabbie is a closed station located in the town of Toongabbie, on the Maffra railway line in Victoria, Australia.

History
It opened in 1883 with the construction of the line from Traralgon to Heyfield and was 176 km from Southern Cross. In 1927, the amount of revenue derived from the station was £937. The station closed in 1986.

References

Disused railway stations in Victoria (Australia)
Transport in Gippsland (region)
City of Latrobe